The Statue of Lord Rama is a planned monument in Ayodhya, Uttar Pradesh, India dedicated to the Hindu deity Rama. The cost of the statue is estimated to be  .

Plan 
The Yogi Adityanath government had announced in 2017 that it would construct a Rama statue in Ayodhya as part of the “Navya Ayodhya” scheme of the UP Tourism Department to develop the area into a tourist center. On 24 November 2018, the design of the statue was finalised. On 2 March 2019, the Uttar Pradesh cabinet cleared ₹ 200 crore for the "detailed project report" as well as for 28.28 hectares identified for the project. Technical support from the Gujarat government, National Environmental Engineering Research Institute and IIT Kanpur has been sought.

In November 2019,  was allocated to acquire 61 hectares of land in Mirpur, Ayodhya, for the statue, museum, library, food court and other tourist amenities. However due to land uncertainties, the location has not been finalized and may be shifted to Manja Barhata village in Ayodhya.

The statue of Rama would be accompanied by one of Nishadaraja Kevata, a boatman who helped Rama, Sita and Laxman cross the Ganga when in exile. Yogi Adityanath, the chief minister of Uttar Pradesh, had in September said ₹ 34 crore would be allocated for the project of Nishadraj.

In August 2019, Member of Parliament Karan Singh had asked the government of Uttar Pradesh to build both a statue for Lord Rama as well as his wife the goddess Sita. Karan Singh had also made the same request in December 2018.

See also
 List of tallest statues
 Statue of Unity

References

R
Hindu gods in art
R
Proposed infrastructure in Uttar Pradesh
R
Ayodhya